Kolonnawa electoral district was an electoral district of Sri Lanka between March 1960 and February 1989. The district was named after the town of Kolonnawa in Colombo District, Western Province. The 1978 Constitution of Sri Lanka introduced the proportional representation electoral system for electing members of Parliament. The existing 160 mainly single-member electoral districts were replaced with 22 multi-member electoral districts. Kolonnawa electoral district was replaced by the Colombo multi-member electoral district at the 1989 general elections.

Members of Parliament
Key

Elections

1960 (March) Parliamentary General Election

1960 (July) Parliamentary General Election

1965 Parliamentary General Election

1970 Parliamentary General Election

1977 Parliamentary General Election

References

Former electoral districts of Sri Lanka
Politics of Colombo District